The brown-mandibled aracari (Pteroglossus mariae) is a near-passerine bird in the toucan family Ramphastidae. It is found in Bolivia, Brazil, and Peru.

Taxonomy and systematics

The brown-mandibled aracari is considered a monotypic species by the International Ornithological Committee. However, The South American Classification Committee of the American Ornithological Society, the Clements taxonomy, and BirdLife International's Handbook of the Birds of the World (HBW) treat it as a subspecies of the ivory-billed aracari (P. azara). The brown-mandibled aracari and the two subspecies of ivory-billed aracari recognized by the IOC have all at times been treated as species, but all three taxa interbreed where their ranges overlap.

Description

It does not appreciably differ from the ivory-billed aracari in length, weight, or plumage but only in bill color. Adult males have a black cap above a chestnut head and throat, maroon-red nape and upper back, green lower back, and red rump. They have a narrow black band under the throat, a wide red band on the upper breast, a wide black band on the lower breast, a yellow belly, and green thighs. Adult females have a dark brown cap and a narrower black band below the throat than males. The bills of both sexes have a yellow to ivory maxilla with black and white markings on the edge that resemble teeth. Its mandible is mostly orange-brown with an ivory or yellow tip and a vertical yellow line at its base.

Distribution and habitat

The brown-mandibled aracari is found south of the Amazon River from eastern Peru to the Rio Madeira in western Brazil and south to central Bolivia. It inhabits a variety of forest landscapes including varzea, gallery forest, and secondary forest, and to a lesser extent terra firme, bamboo, cloudforest, and plantations. It is more common in early- to mid-successional forest than mature.

Behavior

Movement

The brown-mandibled aracari is believed to be a year-round resident throughout its range.

Feeding

The brown-mandibled aracari forages in the forest's upper level and the canopy, typically in pairs or in a small group. There are few details known of its diet but it appears to be mostly fruit with some arthropods.

Breeding

The brown-mandibled aracari's breeding season spans from February to August. It is assumed to nest in tree cavities like other toucans. Its clutch size is two to four eggs. Nothing else is known about its breeding biology.

Vocalization

What is thought to be the brown-mandibled aracari's song is "a series of 2–6 wailing 'twaaa-a-a' or 'tweee-ee' or 'traaa-at' notes". Other vocalizations include "rattles, grunt-like contact notes, nasal 'nyek', purr-like notes, 'kyeek' alarm, [and] pure rattles 'bddddt'".

Status

The IUCN follows HBW taxonomy and so does not separately assess the ivory-billed and brown-mandibled aracaris. Taken as a whole it has a very large range, and though its population size is not known it is believed to be stable. No immeditate threats have been identified. The "[v]aried habitats utilized and changing nature of its successional habitats suggest that [the] species is not likely to become threatened in near future.

References

brown-mandibled aracari
Birds of the Amazon Basin
Birds of the Bolivian Amazon
Birds of the Peruvian Amazon
brown-mandibled aracari
Taxonomy articles created by Polbot
Taxobox binomials not recognized by IUCN